Ludwig Schmitt (28 October 1910 – after 1941) was a German footballer. He played club football with Eintracht Frankfurt.

Career 
The trained fitter Ludwig Schmitt played for Frankfurt club BSC Oberrad until 1930 when he was signed for Eintracht Frankfurt playing there until 1938. He won with Eintracht Bezirksliga Main-Hessen in 1930 which advanced the Frankfurt club to the Southern German Championship where the Eagles finished as runners-up to SpVgg Fürth. Thus, Eintracht advanced further to the 1931 German championship play-offs and were terminated in the quarter-finals.

Despite being talented Schmitt remained an understudy to Willibald Kreß of Rot-Weiss Frankfurt and Jahn Regensburg's Hans Jakob in both the South German selection and the German national team. However, in 1931 he was called up to an international match in Denmark as a back-up.

In the next two seasons Schmitt's Eintracht won another two Bezirksliga Main-Hessen league titles and in 1931-32 even won the Southern German Championship when after a heated up decider match against Bayern Munich that was abandoned after 83 minutes. After both teams advanced through the German championship play-offs Bayern won the  final match to be crowned German champions.

After the 1933-34 he lost his regular spot at the Riederwald club and later was an on and off regular fixture as a goalkeeper.

In his last Eintracht season he won the Gauliga Südwest/Mainhessen without making any appearances.

Schmitt died in Soviet war captivity.

Honours 
 Bezirksliga Main-Hessen:
 Champion: 1930–31, 1931–32
 Runner-up: 1932–33
 Southern German Championship
 Champion: 1931–32
 Runner-up: 1930–31
 German Championship
 Runner-up: 1932
 Gauliga Südwest/Mainhessen:
 Champion: 1937–38
 Runner-up: 1936–37

References

Sources

External links
 Ludwig Schmitt at eintracht-archiv.de

1910 births
Year of death uncertain
German footballers
Eintracht Frankfurt players
Footballers from Frankfurt
Association football goalkeepers
German prisoners of war in World War II held by the Soviet Union
German people who died in Soviet detention